Major-General Dejazmatch Beyene Merid (sometimes rendered as Beine Merid) (1897 - 24 February 1937) was an Ethiopian army commander, a patriot, and the son-in-law of Emperor Haile Selassie I.

Biography
Son of Dejazmatch Merid. Dejazmatch Beyenne Merid married Leult  Romanework, the daughter of Haile Selassie. He spent most of his career as the Shum   of Bale. By 1935, he had also established himself as the Shum of Gamu-Gofa.

During the Second Italo-Ethiopian War, Dejazmach  Beyenne Merid commanded the Army of Bale and fought on the "southern front" against Italian forces based in Italian Somaliland. Before the Battle of Genale Doria, Beyenne Merid and the 4,000 strong Army of Bale advanced down the Shebelle River with the intention of invading central Italian Somaliland. Beyene Merid and his army was able to move forward quickly due to the good terrain along the Shebelle River. In November, advancing elements of Beyenne Merid's force clashed with about 1,000 dubats of the pro-Italian Olol Diinle. Both sides withdrew from the battlefield in the end, but Beyene Merid had been seriously wounded. Its commander stricken, the Army of Bale retired from battle.

During the Italian occupation, Beyenne Merid fought as an Arbegna. On 24 February 1937, he and his forces joined up with Ras   Desta Damtew and his forces. On the same day, he and Desta Damtew were captured by the Italians. They were then immediately executed.

Family
Beyene Merid and Romane Work had four sons. In 1930, Lij  Getachew Beyene was born. In May 1932, Dejazmatch Merid Beyene was born. In 1934, Dejazmatch Samson Beyene was born. In 1935, Lij Gideon Beyene was born. Only Merid and Samson survived the Italian occupation.

See also
 Ethiopian aristocratic and court titles
 Ethiopian Order of Battle Second Italo-Abyssinian War
 Desta Damtew - Another son-in-law of Haile Selassie 
 Haile Selassie Gugsa - Another son-in-law of Haile Selassie

Notes 
Footnotes

Citations

References
 
 
 
 

1897 births
1937 deaths
Ethiopian nobility
Ethiopian military personnel
Executed Ethiopian people
Executed military personnel
20th-century executions by Italy